Roberto Carlos Fernández Toro (born July 12, 1999) is a Bolivian professional footballer who plays as a leftback for Bolívar and the Bolivia national team.

International career
Fernández represented the national U-20 side at the 2019 South American U-20 Championship. He made his senior debut for the Bolivia national football team in a 1-0 friendly loss to Japan on 26 March 2019.

International goals

References

External links
 
 

1999 births
Living people
Bolivian footballers
Bolivia international footballers
Club Bolívar players
Bolivian Primera División players
Association football fullbacks
2019 Copa América players
2021 Copa América players
Sportspeople from Santa Cruz de la Sierra
Bolivia youth international footballers